Daejarn Asi (born 15 August 2000) is a New Zealand professional rugby league footballer who plays as a  and  for the Parramatta Eels in the NRL. 

He previously played for the North Queensland Cowboys, New Zealand Warriors in the National Rugby League and the New Zealand Māori at representative level.

Background
Born in Christchurch, New Zealand, Asi is of Samoan (Solosolo and Afega), Māori (Ngāi Tahu and Tuhoe) and English descent. He played his junior rugby league for the Aranui Eagles before moving to Australia.

In Australia, he played his junior rugby league for the Nerang Roosters and Ormeau Shearers. Asi attended Keebra Park State High School and later Brisbane Grammar School before being signed by the North Queensland Cowboys.

Playing career
In 2016, Asi played for Gold Coast Green in the Cyril Connell Cup. In 2018, he played for the Norths Devils in the Mal Meninga Cup.

In 2019, Asi moved to Townsville, where he played for the Townsville Blackhawks in the Hastings Deering Colts. Later that season, he made his debut for the Blackhawks' Queensland Cup side.

2020
In January, Asi was a member of the Queensland under-20 Emerging Origin squad. In February, he re-signed with the Cowboys on a three-year deal.

Asi played five games in his rookie season, missing time due to minor knee injuries.

2021
On 20 February, Asi represented the Māori All Stars, coming off the bench in their 10-all draw with the Indigenous All Stars.

Asi began the 2021 season playing for the Blackhawks before making a mid-season switch to the Mackay Cutters. He returned to first grade in Round 17, starting at fullback in a loss to the 46–18 loss to the South Sydney Rabbitohs.

He played five games for the Cowboys in 2021, starting three at centre.

2022
In 2022, Asi joined the New Zealand Warriors. He played his first game for the Warriors in round 8 of the 2022 NRL season.  Asi made a total of eight appearances for the New Zealand club as they finished 15th on the table.  On 6 September, he was released by the New Zealand Warriors.
In November, Asi signed a contract to join Parramattta for the 2023 season.

Statistics

NRL
 Statistics are correct to the end of the 2021 season

References

External links
North Queensland Cowboys profile
NRL profile

2000 births
Living people
Mackay Cutters players
New Zealand emigrants to Australia
New Zealand Māori rugby league players
New Zealand people of English descent
New Zealand sportspeople of Samoan descent
New Zealand rugby league players
North Queensland Cowboys players
New Zealand Warriors players
Rugby league centres
Rugby league five-eighths
Rugby league players from Christchurch
Townsville Blackhawks players